Graptartia is a genus of African corinnid sac spiders first described by Eugène Simon in 1896.  it contains only two species.

References

Araneomorphae genera
Corinnidae
Spiders of Africa
Taxa named by Eugène Simon